The Finland men's national basketball team represents Finland in international basketball competition. The national team is governed by Basketball Finland.

Finland has played in 17 EuroBasket tournaments, with their best finish coming in sixth place at EuroBasket 1967 on home soil. The national team has also reached the Olympic Games twice, in 1952 as the host, and 1964. In 2014, Finland qualified for their first ever appearance to the FIBA World Cup.

Since 2011, Finland has had the highest FIBA World Ranking among Nordic countries.

History

Early years
The Finnish Basketball Association was founded in February 1939. A few months earlier the Finnish Football Federation had decided to add basketball to its own repertoire.
Finland first competed at the European championship at its third installment, the EuroBasket 1939. In the round-robin, they initially struggled and lost to each of the other seven teams and finished with a 70–541 overall point differential.

1950s
Finland's next European competition was 12 years later, at the EuroBasket 1951 in Paris.  Overall, they fared much better and split their four preliminary round games and finished at third place in the group at 2–2 but were eliminated from championship contention.  They had success after that, winning all three of their classification round 1 games and both round 2 games to finish in 9th place of the 18 teams.

In 1952, by virtue of hosting the games in Helsinki, Finland played at the Summer Olympics for the first time. The national team finished at the bottom of Group B in the preliminary round losing all of its game to the Soviet Union, Bulgaria and Mexico, and failing to advance.

Finland used this international experience when they competed again at the EuroBasket 1953 in Moscow. In the preliminary round, they finished with 1 win and 3 losses for 4th place of the 5 teams in the group. They fared significantly better in the first classification round, winning 3 and losing only 1 to finish in the middle of a three-way tie in the group. They lost both the 9–12 and 11/12 classification games, however, taking 12th place of 17 overall.

At the next event, Finland had some difficulty in the preliminary round of EuroBasket 1955.  They lost all three early games in Budapest and were relegated to the classification round.  Once again, not faced with the world elite opponents anymore, the Fins shone in the classification round and won all four of the pool play games. They won their classification 9–12 match as well, but lost to France in the 9/10 final to finish 10th of 18 in the tournament.

In Sofia, at the EuroBasket 1957, the Finns finished third in their preliminary group after going 1–2. They moved to the 9–16 classification pool and won five games there with only one loss. They took 11th place overall in the tournament.

Modern era

At the EuroBasket 1995 in Greece, was Finland's first qualification to the top European basketball tournament since 1977. The national team did not fair too well at the event though. As they were routed in their first match against Russia 126-74, and ultimately led to them finishing with an 0-6 record (13th place) and were eliminated.

Finland qualified for the EuroBasket 2011. The tournament berth was the first for Finland in 16 years. There they finished third out of six teams in EuroBasket 2011 Group C and defeated Bosnia and Herzegovina 92–64 and Montenegro 71–65. This allowed them to they qualify for the EuroBasket 2011 Group F. In their first match they were easily defeated by Russia but afterwards they defeated Georgia, before losing to Slovenia in their final match of the tournament. Despite not making it to the best of 8 tournament, Finland ended up making it to their first ever FIBA World Cup as a wild card team alongside Greece, Turkey, and Brazil.

Competitive record

FIBA World Cup

Olympic Games

EuroBasket

Results and fixtures

2021

2022

2023

{{basketballbox collapsible
|format     = 1
|round      = 2023 FIBA World Cup qualifiers – 2nd round
|date       = 27 February 2023
|time       = 18:30 EET (UTC+2)
|arena      = Espoo Metro Areena
|location   = Espoo, Finland
|teamA      = 
|scoreA     = 81
|teamB      = 
|scoreB     = 87
|Q1         = 22–17
|Q2         = 21–29
|Q3         = 19–23|Q4         = 19–18
|report     = Boxscore
|points1    = Jantunen 20
|rebounds1  = Jantunen 6
|assist1    = Maxhuni 6
|points2    = Voigtmann 23
|rebounds2  = Voigtmann 9
|assist2    = Hollatz 14
|attendance = 6,504
|referee    = Mārtiņš Kozlovskis (LAT), Aleksandar Glišić (SRB), Viola Györgyi (NOR)
|result     = L
}}

Team
Current roster
Roster for the 2023 FIBA World Cup Qualifiers matches on 24 and 27 February 2023 against Israel and Germany.

Depth chart

Head coach position

Past rosters1939 EuroBasket: finished 8th among 8 teams

3 Martti Salminen, 4 Kalevi Ihalainen, 5 Ilkka Törrönen, 6 Erkki Saurala, 8 Pentti Vuollekoski, 9 Pauli Sarkkula, 10 Heinonen, 11 Erkki Lindén, 12 Vladi Marmo, 13 Reino Valtonen, 14 Alo Suurna (Coach: Alois Suurna)1951 EuroBasket: finished 9th among 17 teams

3 Oiva Virtanen, 4 Raimo Lindholm, 5 Juhani Kyöstilä, 6 Timo Suviranta, 7 Pentti Laaksonen, 8 Raine Nuutinen, 9 Kalevi Sylander, 11 Arto Koivisto, 12 Pertti Mutru, 13 Kalevi Heinänen, 14 Kaj Gustafsson, 15 Olli Arppe, 16 Allan Pietarinen, 17 Tapio Pöyhönen (Coach: Eino Ojanen)1952 Olympic Games: finished 15th among 23 teams

3 Juhani Kyöstilä, 4 Raine Nuutinen, 5 Raimo Lindholm, 6 Timo Suviranta, 7 Kalevi Heinänen, 8 Pentti Laaksonen, 9 Oiva Virtanen, 10 Esko Karhunen, 11 Eero Salonen, 12 Pertti Mutru, 13 Tapio Pöyhönen (Coach: Matti Simola)1953 EuroBasket: finished 12th among 17 teams

3 Timo Lampen, 4 Raine Nuutinen, 5 Raimo Lindholm, 6 Timo Suviranta, 7 Keijo Hynninen, 8 Kalevi Heinänen, 9 Pentti Laaksonen, 10 Oiva Virtanen, 11 Eero Salonen, 12 Kaj Gustafsson, 13 Pertti Mutru, 14 Allan Pietarinen (Coach: Eino Ojanen)1955 EuroBasket: finished 10th among 18 teams

3 Timo Lampén, 4 Raine Nuutinen, 5 Raimo Lindholm, 6 Timo Suviranta, 7 Kalevi Heinänen, 8 Oiva Virtanen, 9 Eero Salonen, 10 Kalevi Sylander, 11 Taisto Ravantti, 12 Seppo Kuusela, 13 Asko Jokinen, 14 Pertti Mutru, 15 Kalevi Tuominen (Coach: Eino Ojanen)1957 EuroBasket: finished 11th among 16 teams

3 Timo Lampén, 4 Raine Nuutinen, 5 Raimo Lindholm, 6 Timo Suviranta, 7 Arvo Jantunen, 8 Paavo Suhonen, 9 Juhani Kala, 10 Seppo Kuusela, 11 Kalevi Sylander, 12 Eero Salonen, 13 Pertti Mutru, 14 Arto Koivisto (Coach: Kalevi Tuominen)1959 EuroBasket: finished 13th among 17 teams

3 Matti Köli, 4 Timo Lampén, 5 Pentti Palkoaho, 6 Matti Nenonen, 7 Raine Nuutinen, 8 Raimo Lindholm, 9 Arvo Jantunen, 10 Kyösti Rousti, 11 Juhani Kala, 12 Seppo Kuusela, 13 Eero Salonen, 14 Raimo Vartia (Coach: Kalevi Tuominen)1961 EuroBasket: finished 14th among 19 teams

4 Uolevi Manninen, 5 Kari Liimo, 6 Timo Lampén, 7 Pertti Laanti, 8 Lauri Nurma, 9 Martti Liimo, 10 Tony Bärlund, 11 Raimo Lindholm, 12 Rauno Ailus, 13 Arvo Jantunen, 14 Seppo Kuusela, 15 Raimo Vartia (Coach: Kalevi Tuominen)1963 EuroBasket: finished 14th among 16 teams

4 Uolevi Manninen, 5 Kari Liimo, 6 Timo Lampén, 7 Pertti Laanti, 8 Martti Liimo, 9 Juha Harjula, 10 Antero Siljola, 11 Rauno Ailus, 12 Kauko Kauppinen, 13 Jorma Pilkevaara, 14 Seppo Kuusela, 15 Raimo Vartia (Coach: Kalevi Tuominen)1964 Olympic Games: finished 11th among 16 teams

4 Uolevi Manninen, 5 Kari Liimo, 6 Timo Lampén, 7 Pertti Laanti, 8 Martti Liimo, 9 Raimo Lindholm, 10 Juha Harjula, 11 Risto Kala, 12 Kauko Kauppinen, 13 Jorma Pilkevaara, 14 Teijo Finneman, 15 Raimo Vartia (Coach: Kalevi Tuominen)1965 EuroBasket: finished 12th among 16 teams

4 Uolevi Manninen, 5 Kari Liimo, 6 Timo Lampén, 7 Pertti Laanti, 8 Martti Liimo, 9 Kari Lahti, 10 Hannu Paananen, 11 Jorma Pilkevaara, 12 Kari Rönnholm, 13 Lars Karell, 14 Teijo Finneman, 15 Jyrki Immonen (Coach: Kalevi Tuominen)1967 EuroBasket: finished 6th among 16 teams

4 Veikko Vainio, 5 Kari Liimo, 6 Uolevi Manninen, 7 Pertti Laanti, 8 Martti Liimo, 9 Kari Lahti, 10 Kari Rönnholm, 11 Lars Karell, 12 Jorma Pilkevaara, 13 Olavi Ahonen, 14 Teijo Finneman, 15 Jyrki Immonen (Coach: Kalevi Tuominen)1977 EuroBasket: finished 10th among 12 teams

4 Kalevi Sarkalahti 5 Heikki Kasko, 6 Tapio Sten, 7 Heikki Taponen, 8 Antti Zitting, 9 Risto Lignell, 10 Raimo Mäntynen, 11 Anssi Rauramo, 12 Mikko Koskinen, 13 Klaus Mahlamäki, 14 Jarmo Laitinen, 15 Erkki Saaristo (Coach: Robert Petersen)1995 EuroBasket: finished 13th among 14 teams

4 Martti Kuisma, 5 Hanno Möttölä, 6 Pekka Markkanen, 7 Sakari Pehkonen, 8 Jarkko Tuomala, 9 Markku Larkio, 10 Riku Marttinen, 11 Mika-Matti Tahvanainen, 12 Juha Luhtanen, 13 Jyri Lehtonen, 14 Kari-Pekka Klinga, 15 Petri-Mikael Niiranen (Coach: Henrik Dettmann)2011 EuroBasket: finished 9th among 24 teams

4 Mikko Koivisto, 5 Antti Nikkilä, 6 Kimmo Muurinen, 7 Shawn Huff, 8 Gerald Lee, 9 Sasu Salin, 10 Tuukka Kotti, 11 Petteri Koponen, 12 Vesa Mäkäläinen, 13 Hanno Möttölä, 14 Petri Virtanen, 15 Teemu Rannikko (Coach: Henrik Dettmann) 2013 EuroBasket: finished 9th among 24 teams

4 Mikko Koivisto, 5 Antti Nikkilä, 6 Kimmo Muurinen, 7 Shawn Huff, 8 Gerald Lee, 9 Sasu Salin, 10 Tuukka Kotti, 11 Petteri Koponen, 12 Samuel Haanpää, 13 Hanno Möttölä, 14 Roope Ahonen, 15 Teemu Rannikko (Coach: Henrik Dettmann)2014 FIBA World Cup: finished 22nd among 24 teams

4 Mikko Koivisto, 5 Erik Murphy, 6 Kimmo Muurinen, 7 Shawn Huff, 8 Gerald Lee, 9 Sasu Salin, 10 Tuukka Kotti, 11 Petteri Koponen, 12 Matti Nuutinen, 13 Hanno Möttölä (C), 14 Antero Lehto, 15 Teemu Rannikko (Coach: Henrik Dettmann)2015 EuroBasket: finished 16th among 24 teams

4 Mikko Koivisto, 7 Shawn Huff (C), 8 Gerald Lee, 9 Sasu Salin, 10 Tuukka Kotti, 11 Petteri Koponen, 12 Matti Nuutinen, 21 Ville Kaunisto, 24 Joonas Cavén, 30 Roope Ahonen, 31 Jamar Wilson, 33 Erik Murphy (Coach: Henrik Dettmann)2017 EuroBasket: finished 11th among 24 teams

4 Mikko Koivisto, 7 Shawn Huff (C), 8 Gerald Lee, 9 Sasu Salin, 10 Tuukka Kotti, 11 Petteri Koponen, 12 Matti Nuutinen, 15 Teemu Rannikko, 22 Carl Lindbom, 23 Lauri Markkanen, 31 Jamar Wilson, 33 Erik Murphy (Coach: Henrik Dettmann)2022 EuroBasket: finished 7th among 24 teams

1 Miro Little, 7 Shawn Huff (C)''', 9 Sasu Salin, 11 Petteri Koponen, 14 Henri Kantonen, 18 Mikael Jantunen, 19 Elias Valtonen, 20 Alexander Madsen, 21 Edon Maxhuni, 23 Lauri Markkanen, 35 Ilari Seppälä, 41 Topias Palmi (Coach: Lassi Tuovi)

Kit

Manufacturer
2015: Li-ning
2019: Adidas

Sponsor
Finnair
Nokia
Vantaan Energia
2015: Microsoft
2019: PostNord

See also

Sport in Finland
Finland women's national basketball team
Finland men's national under-20 basketball team
Finland men's national under-19 basketball team
Finland men's national under-17 basketball team

References

External links

Finland FIBA profile 
Finland National Team – Men at Eurobasket.com
Finland Basketball Records at FIBA Archive

Videos
Finland - Tournament Highlights - 2014 FIBA World Cup Youtube.com video

 
Men's national basketball teams
1939 establishments in Finland
Basketball teams established in 1939